The Sister Catherine Treatise is a work of Medieval Christian mysticism seen as representative of the Heresy of the Free Spirit of the thirteenth and fourteenth centuries in Europe. Wrongly attributed to Christian mystic Meister Eckhart, it nevertheless shows the influence of his ideas (as evinced by the full German title), or at least the ideas which he was accused or attributed as having had by the Inquisition.

Mystical dialogue

The Sister Catherine Treatise takes the form of a series of dialogues in Middle High German between a woman (Sister Catherine) and her Confessor (not named but sometimes said to be Eckhart). 

Sister Catherine is determined to find "the shortest way" to God and comes to her Confessor for advice. In the first section her Confessor urges her to rebuke sin and seek purity so as to receive God. She leaves with the intention of doing so.

Years later Sister Catherine returns to speak again to her Confessor, but this time the roles are reversed. Sister Catherine has experienced God and, after falling seemingly dead for three days (in imitation of Christ), reawakens to claim that she has achieved a unity with God which is eternal and which will last throughout this life and beyond. Sister Catherine is presented as having gone further down the road of spiritual development than her Confessor and he finds himself praising her for her Holiness rather than the other way round. 

Sister Catherine speaks of her unity with God in the following terms:

The rest of the treatise consists of a continued dialogue with the Confessor – often held at a fever-pitch of excitement and emotion – in which both Sister Catherine and the Confessor exchange ideas about God's immanence, the possibility of humanity's union with Him in this life, the role of Mary Magdalene's relationship with Christ as his Lover and chief Apostle and the need to recognise the deceptions of the reality and unreality of Union with God i.e. what true Union is as opposed to false Union. Here the treatise is careful to delineate the danger of those who interpret the Free Spirit ideals as carte blanche to commit sinful and/or immoral acts. The treatise finishes with Sister Catherine abjuring the Confessor to strive after higher feats of spiritual understanding, the pupil having become the master (or mistress) and the Confessor needing the guidance of the Sister to achieve union with God.

Assessment

The Sister Catherine Treatise is often cited, along with Marguerite Porete's The Mirror of Simple Souls, as one of the representative literary expressions of the Heresy of the Free Spirit, which held that a divine union with God was possible to people in this life and, more controversially, independently of the ministrations of the Church. Initially attributed to Meister Eckhart in Franz Pfeiffer's ground-breaking edition of the Christian mystic's works in 1857 it is now regarded as not being by him but showing evidence of his thinking, or at least evidence of the Free Spirit movement which Eckhart was accused of adhering to.

Written in a heightened emotional prose which gives the Treatise a slightly hysterical, hallucinatory quality the work espouses a highly feminine approach to the Christian Mystery, with lengthy discussions of the significance of Mary Magdalene as the true lover of Christ (an element which links it to Porete, some of the alleged beliefs of the Cathars and the speculations of Dan Brown) and the figure of Sister Catherine herself emerging as more initiated into the inner spirituality of Christianity than her male counterpart. In it many of the articles of faith of the Free Spirit movement are expressed – a neo-Platonic/panentheistic belief in God's immanence in Creation, the possibility of salvation and the Unio Mystica in this life, the limitations of Church teaching in terms of real mystical insight – and as such it is a valuable document for those in search of understanding the more radical approach to interpreting the Gospels of the Medieval period known as the Heresy of the Free Spirit.

The treatise is the only known medieval work which could contain an allusion to the well-known question of how many angels can stand on the point of a needle:  tusent selen siczen in dem himelrich uff einer nadel spicz "in heaven a thousand souls can sit on the point of a needle."  However the reference is to souls, not angels, and dancing on the point of a needle or pin appears to be a later concept.

See also
Brethren of the Free Spirit
Cathars/Catharism
Christianity
Christian mysticism
Heresy of the Free Spirit
Inquisition
Marguerite Porete
Mary Magdalene
Meister Eckhart

References
Bernard McGinn, ed., Meister Eckhart - Teacher and Preacher. With the collaboration of Frank Tobin and Elvira Borgstadt, preface by Kenneth Northcott. New York: Paulist Press, 1986. 
Ben Morgan. On Becoming God: Late Medieval Mysticism and the Modern Western Self. New York: Fordham UP, 2013
Robert Lerner, The Heresy of the Free Spirit in the Later Middle Ages. Berkeley: University of California Press, 1972.
Franz-Josef Schweitzer, Der Freiheitsbegriff der deutschen Mystik: Seine Beziehung zur Ketzerei der "Brüder und Schwestern vom Freien Geist", mit besonderer Rücksicht auf den pseudoeckhartischen Traktat "Schwester Katrei". Frankfurt: Lang, 1981.
Otto Simon, Überlieferung und Handschriftenverhältnis des Traktates '"Schwester Katrei": Ein Beitrag zur Geschichte der deutschen Mystik. Halle: Ehrhardt Karras, 1906 (scanned version: https://archive.org/details/UeberlieferungUndHandschriftenverhaeltnisDesTraktatesSchwesterKatrei)

Visionary literature
Esoteric Christianity
Medieval literature
14th-century Christian texts
Treatises